
Year 352 BC was a year of the pre-Julian Roman calendar. At the time it was known as the Year of the Consulship of Poplicola and Rutilus (or, less frequently, year 402 Ab urbe condita). The denomination 352 BC for this year has been used since the early medieval period, when the Anno Domini calendar era became the prevalent method in Europe for naming years.

Events 
 By place 
 Greece 
 After two initial efforts, Philip II of Macedon drives the Phocians south after a major victory over them in the Battle of Crocus Field. Athens and Sparta come to the assistance of the Phocians and Philip is checked at Thermopylae. Philip does not attempt to advance into central Greece with the Athenians occupying this pass. With this victory, Philip accrues great glory as the righteous avenger of Apollo, since the Phocian general Onomarchos has plundered the sacred treasury of Delphi to pay his mercenaries. Onomarchos' body is crucified, and the prisoners are drowned as ritual demanded for temple-robbers.
 Philip then moves against Thrace. He makes a successful expedition into Thrace, gaining a firm ascendancy in the country, and brings away a son of Cersobleptes, the King of Thrace, as a hostage. Philip II's Thessalian victory earns him election as president (archon) of the Thessalian League.

Births

Deaths

References